John Quincy "Quince" Banbury (August 29, 1883 – January 19, 1956) was an American football player and coach.

Playing career
Banbury played for the University of Pittsburgh and was captain of the team in 1908.  He also was on the track and field team and competed in the long jump.

Coaching career
Banbury was the head football coach at  Bethany College in Lindsborg, Kansas.  He held that position for three seasons, from 1917 until 1919.  His record at Bethany was 5–14–2.

Death
Banbury died on January 19, 1956.

References

External links
 

1883 births
1956 deaths
American male long jumpers
Bethany Swedes football coaches
Bethany Swedes football players
Friends Falcons football coaches
Pittsburgh Panthers football players
Pittsburgh Panthers men's track and field athletes
Wichita State Shockers football coaches
People from Danville, Ohio